Gerald Russell Conlee (August 22, 1914 – July 15, 2005) was an American football center.

Conlee was born in Porterville, California, in 1914 and attended Chico High School in Chico, California. He played college football at St. Mary's from 1934 to 1936.

He played professional football in the National Football League for the Cleveland Rams in 1938 and the Detroit Lions in 1943 and in the All-America Football Conference for the San Francisco 49ers from 1946 to 1947. He appeared in 41 professional football games, seven of them as a starter. 

He died in 2005 in El Cajon, California.

References

1914 births
2005 deaths
American football centers
Cleveland Rams players
People from Porterville, California
San Francisco 49ers players
Sportspeople from Chico, California
Sportspeople from Tulare County, California
Saint Mary's Gaels football players
Players of American football from California